Eucalyptus angulosa, also known as the ridge fruited mallee or southern ridge fruited mallee, is a eucalypt that is native to Western Australia. The Noongar peoples know the tree as quarral or kwaral.

Description
It blooms between August and March producing white to creamy yellow flowers. It has a lignotuber and can form multiple stems. The bark is smooth and a grey colour with loose strips of rough bark accumulating toward the base. It remains smooth but becomes a pale grey, grey-brown, white or pinkish to coppery colour with ribbons on the upper branches. The thick, concolorous, glossy, green adult leaves have an alternate arrangement. Each axillary inflorescence is unbranched with flattened peduncles. The fruit is also pedicellate and has a cylindrical, hemispherical or urceolate shape.

Taxonomy
The species was first formally described by the botanist Johannes Conrad Schauer in the work Repertorium Botanices Systematicae in 1843 by Schauer and Wilhelm Gerhard Walpers. Synonyms for the species include; Eucalyptus grossifolia as described by L.A.S.Johnson and K.D.Hill, Eucalyptus angulosa Schauer var. angulosa by C.A.Gardner, Eucalyptus incrassata var. angulosa by George Bentham and Eucalyptus incrassata subsp. angulosa by F.C.Johnstone & Hallam.
The species name angulosa is taken from the Latin word angulosus meaning angled, referring to the branchlets and buds. E. angulosais part of the Eucalyptus subgenus Symphyomyrtus section Dumaria along with other species including E. incrassata, E. captiosa, E. singularis and E. ceratocorys.

Distribution
It is found on coastal headlands and dunes as part of mallee communities along the south coast in the Great Southern and Goldfields-Esperance regions of western Australia where it grows in white-grey sandy soils often over limestone. The species is also found in South Australia on the southern Eyre Peninsula, the southern Fleurieu Peninsula and much less commonly in the Murray-Darling depression. The species is common in Western Australia but much less common in South Australia.

Cultivation
The plant is sold commercially as tube stock or seeds. It germinates readily as is used as an ornamental species or in land restoration. It is a slow grower and is salt and drought tolerant. It grows well in a full sunny position and has low maintenance requirements.

See also

List of Eucalyptus species
Eucalyptus × erythrandra

References

angulosa
Endemic flora of Western Australia
Mallees (habit)
Flora of South Australia
Myrtales of Australia
Eucalypts of Western Australia
Trees of Australia
Plants described in 1843
Taxa named by Johannes Conrad Schauer